Ganpat Rao Gaekwad was the ninth Maharaja of Baroda State reigning from 1847 to 1856. He was the eldest son of Sayaji Rao Gaekwad II and became Maharaja of Baroda after the death of his father.

He died in 1856 and after his death, he was succeeded by his second younger brother Khanderao II Gaekwad.

See also
Gaekwad dynasty

References

External links

 Official Website of the Gaekwads of Baroda 

1816 births
1859 deaths
Maharajas of Vadodara
Hindu monarchs
Indian royalty
Indian military leaders